Chloris is a figure in Greek mythology. The name can also refer to:

 Chloris  (plant), a genus of grasses
 Chloris  (bird), a genus of birds known as the greenfinches
 Parula, a genus of birds that has invalidly been called Chloris
 410 Chloris, an asteroid
 Chloris family, an asteroid family named after its principal body, 410 Chloris
 Chloris, the pseudonym of Jean Lorimer (1775–1831) with the songs of Robert Burns

See also
 Cloris Leachman (1926–2021), American actress